Korop Raion  was a raion (district) of Chernihiv Oblast, northern Ukraine. Its administrative centre was located at the urban-type settlement of Korop. The raion was abolished on 18 July 2020 as part of the administrative reform of Ukraine, which reduced the number of raions of Chernihiv Oblast to five. The area of Korop Raion was merged into Novhorod-Siverskyi Raion. The last estimate of the raion population was 

At the time of disestablishment, the raion consisted of two hromadas:
 Korop settlement hromada with the administration in Korop;
 Ponornytsia settlement hromada with the administration in the urban-type settlement of Ponornytsia.

The raion contained the village of Shabalyniv.

References

Former raions of Chernihiv Oblast
1923 establishments in Ukraine
Ukrainian raions abolished during the 2020 administrative reform